Meiny Epema-Brugman (28 November 1930 – 26 September 2022) was a Dutch politician. A member of the Labour Party, she served in the House of Representatives from 1970 to 1971 and again from 1972 to 1982.

Epema-Brugman died in Huizen on 26 September 2022, at the age of 91.

References

1930 births
2022 deaths
Labour Party (Netherlands) politicians
Members of the House of Representatives (Netherlands)
Members of the Provincial Council of South Holland
Municipal councillors in the Netherlands